Star of the Family is a CBS Television program which premiered on September 22, 1950, and aired until June 26, 1952.

Production history
The show aired in these time slots:

(22 September 1950 – 15 June 1951) Fridays 10-10:30 pm ET
(29 July 1951 – 6 January 1952) Sundays 6:30-7pm ET
(10 January 1952 – 26 June 1952) Thursdays 8-8:30pm ET

Hosts included Morton Downey (1950–1951) and Peter Lind Hayes with Mary Healy (1951–1952). The series was directed by Norman Frank, produced by Perry Lafferty and Coby Ruskin, and written by Adrian Spies. Music was by Carl Hoff and His Orchestra, with the Beatrice Kroft Dancers also featured. Beginning with the January 10, 1952, episode, the show alternated with The George Burns and Gracie Allen Show.

The first season featured people who might be related to a celebrity, and the show contestants tried to guess the name of the celebrity. The celebrity was then brought out to entertain the audience. In the second season, the show became a musical comedy show.

One of the few surviving episodes is available online at TV4U. This is the December 9, 1951 episode, hosted by Hayes and Healy, and featuring Duke Ellington, Gloria LeRoy, and Andy Russell.

Cobey Ruskin was the producer, and John Wray was the director of the program, which was sponsored by Kelvinator.

See also
1950-51 United States network television schedule
1951-52 United States network television schedule

References

External links
Star of the Family (1950–1952) at IMDB
Full episode list at CTVA entry
kinescopes at TV4U

1950 American television series debuts
1952 American television series endings
1950s American variety television series
Black-and-white American television shows
CBS original programming
English-language television shows